Adam Granofsky (born February 15, 1979), better known under his stage name Adam Granduciel, is an American guitarist, singer, songwriter and record producer. He is the frontman and primary songwriter of the indie rock band The War on Drugs, with whom he has recorded five studio albums, and a former member of Kurt Vile's backing band The Violators.

Early life
Adam Granduciel was born in Dover, Massachusetts. His father Mark Granofsky is a first-generation American who was born to Russian-Jewish immigrants.

He attended the Roxbury Latin School of West Roxbury. A French-language pun by a teacher there inspired his stage name; "du ciel" means "of sky" in French. He is a graduate of Dickinson College, where he studied painting and photography.

Personal life
Granduciel began a relationship with actress Krysten Ritter in August 2014. In February 2019, Ritter revealed that she and Granduciel were expecting their first child. Their son, Bruce Julian Knight Granofsky, was born on July 29, 2019. In 2021 they were reported as “drifting apart” in their relationship and split after 7 years together. This was later denied. A source close to Krysten Ritter later denied the pair’s split, telling In Touch, “This is not true and they are still together.”

Discography

The War on Drugs
Studio albums
Wagonwheel Blues (2008)
Slave Ambient (2011)
Lost in the Dream (2014)
A Deeper Understanding (2017)
I Don't Live Here Anymore (2021)

EPs
Barrel of Batteries (2007)
Future Weather (2010)

Kurt Vile
Studio albums
Constant Hitmaker (2008)
God Is Saying This to You... (2009)
Childish Prodigy (2009)
Smoke Ring for My Halo (2011)

EPs
The Hunchback EP (2009)
Square Shells (2010)
So Outta Reach (2011)

The Capitol Years
Dance Away the Terror (2006)

As producer
Water on Mars — Purling Hiss (2013)

As guest performer
Imploding the Mirage on “Blowback” — The Killers (2020)

References

1979 births
Living people
People from Dover, Massachusetts
Jewish American musicians
Jewish American songwriters
Jewish rock musicians
American rock guitarists
American male guitarists
American rock singers
American male singer-songwriters
American rock songwriters
Lead guitarists
Guitarists from Massachusetts
Grammy Award winners
21st-century American singers
21st-century American guitarists
21st-century American male singers
Singer-songwriters from Massachusetts
American indie rock musicians
Record producers from Massachusetts
Dickinson College alumni
21st-century American Jews
The War on Drugs (band) members